Sardar Jai Singh Fani (1941–1977) was the first Sikh to be elected as a Member of Parliament in Afghanistan. He won a seat in the 1969 parliamentary election.

References 

20th-century Afghan politicians
1941 births
1977 deaths